Summoner may refer to:

Magic and religion
 Summoner, a person who practices evocation, the act of calling upon or summoning a spirit or deity 
 Necromancer, a magician who supposedly summons the spirits of the deceased
 Theurgist, a magician who supposedly summons deities
 Apparitor or summoner, an ecclesiastical court official of the Middle Ages
 Summoner (Wicca), a position in a Wiccan coven

Literature
 The Summoner, a character in The Summoner's Tale by Geoffrey Chaucer
 The Summoner, a novel in the Chronicles of the Necromancer series by Gail Z. Martin

Video gaming
 Summoner (video game), fantasy role-playing game originally launched in 2000 for the PlayStation 2
 Summoner 2, the 2002 sequel
 Summoner, a player character who control a "champion" in the video game League of Legends

Other uses
 Summoner (horse) (foaled 1997), a British-bred Thoroughbred racehorse

See also
Summoning (disambiguation)
Summons (disambiguation)
Sumner (disambiguation)